In mathematics, more specifically in linear algebra, the spark of a  matrix  is the smallest integer  such that there exists a set of  columns in  which are linearly dependent. If all the columns are linearly independent,  is usually defined to be 1 more than the number of rows. The concept of matrix spark finds applications in error-correction codes, compressive sensing, and matroid theory, and provides a simple criterion for maximal sparsity of solutions to a system of linear equations.

The spark of a matrix is NP-hard to compute.

Definition
Formally, the spark of a matrix  is defined as follows:

where  is a nonzero vector and  denotes its number of nonzero coefficients. Equivalently, the spark of a matrix  is the size of its smallest circuit  (a subset of column indices such that  has a nonzero solution, but every subset of it does not).

If all the columns are linearly independent,  is usually defined to be  (if  has m rows).

Example
Consider the following matrix .

The spark of this matrix equals 3 because:
The first three columns are linearly dependent because .

Properties
If , the following simple properties hold for the spark of a  matrix :

 (If the spark equals , then the matrix has full rank.)
 if and only if the matrix has a zero column.
.

Criterion for uniqueness of sparse solutions
The spark yields a simple criterion for uniqueness of sparse solutions of linear equation systems.
Given a linear equation system . If this system has a solution  that satisfies , then this solution is the sparsest possible solution. Here  denotes the number of nonzero entries of the vector .

Lower bound in terms of dictionary coherence
If the columns of the matrix  are normalized to unit norm, we can lower bound its spark in terms of its dictionary coherence:

Here, the dictionary coherence  is defined as the maximum correlation between any two columns:
.

Applications
The minimum distance of a linear code equals the spark of its parity-check matrix.

The concept of the spark is also of use in the theory of compressive sensing, where requirements on the spark of the measurement matrix are used to ensure stability and consistency of various estimation techniques. It is also known in matroid theory as the girth of the vector matroid associated with the columns of the matrix. The spark of a matrix is NP-hard to compute.

References 

Signal processing
Matrix theory